The Chilean  slender snake (Galvarinus chilensis) is a genus of snake in the family Colubridae.

It is found in Chile and Argentina.

References 

Galvarinus
Reptiles described in 1837
Reptiles of Chile
Reptiles of Argentina
Snakes of South America
Taxa named by Hermann Schlegel